Gully Boy is a 2019 Indian Hindi-language musical drama film directed by Zoya Akhtar, and written by Akhtar and Reema Kagti. The film was produced by Ritesh Sidhwani, Akhtar and Farhan Akhtar under the banners of Tiger Baby Films and Excel Entertainment productions, with American rapper Nas as an executive producer. It stars Ranveer Singh in the titular role alongside Alia Bhatt, Kalki Koechlin, Siddhant Chaturvedi, Vijay Varma, Amruta Subhash and Vijay Raaz in supporting roles. Inspired by the lives of Indian street rappers DIVINE and Naezy, the film is a coming-of-age story about aspiring street rapper Murad Ahmed (Singh), from the Dharavi slums of Mumbai.

Principal photography for Gully Boy began in January 2018 and wrapped up in April 2018. It was premiered at the Berlin International Film Festival on 9 February 2019 and released on 15 February 2019 to critical acclaim with praise directed towards the music, cinematography, Akhtar's direction, storyline, dialogues, performances (particularly Singh, Bhatt, Chaturvedi, Varma) and the social message.

Gully Boy won a record 13 Filmfare Awards, the most awards for a single film in a year, including Best Film, Best Director, Best Actor (Singh) and Best Actress (Bhatt). It also became the sixth film to win all 4 major awards at the Filmfare Awards (Best Film, Best Director, Best Actor and Best Actress), after Guide (1965), Dilwale Dulhania Le Jayenge (1995), Kuch Kuch Hota Hai (1998), Devdas (2002) and Black (2005). Internationally, it won the NETPAC Award for Best Asian Film at the Bucheon International Fantastic Film Festival in South Korea. It was also selected as the Indian entry for the Best International Feature Film at the 92nd Academy Awards, but it was not nominated.

Plot
Murad Ahmed, a final year college student, lives in the Dharavi slums of Mumbai. His abusive father Aftab Shakir Ahmed brings home a much younger second wife, much to the chagrin of the family. Murad nurtures a fascination for rap music. His longtime and overly possessive girlfriend Safeena Firdausi is training to be a surgeon and routinely meets him in secret.

Forced to work part-time as a chauffeur after Aftab is injured, Murad starts to write, with his lyrics informed by the inequalities he observes while on the job. He befriends local rapper Shrikant "MC Sher" Bhosle, whom he saw performing in his college fest, and begins performing his lyrics at underground shows and rap battles, eventually uploading a video on YouTube.

Berklee College student Shweta "Sky" Mehta, a record producer, reaches out to Murad and Sher after seeing the video, offering to collaborate on a new song. The accompanying video, which is shot in Dharavi, rapidly becomes popular. Murad and Sky grow close and eventually have sex, which Murad keeps from Safeena. When Safeena finds out, she reacts violently towards Sky by smashing a bottle of beer on her head. As a result, she is brought in by the police but is not arrested as Sky doesn't press charges against her. Murad eventually breaks up with Safeena due to her possessive attitude. As Aftab's violence towards him, his brother Suhail and his mother Razia escalates, Murad decides to leave home with Razia and Suhail and work full-time for his maternal uncle Ateeq Khan.

Later, when Sky expresses her romantic feelings for him, Murad declines her advances as he still loves Safeena and decides to reconcile with her. Murad and Sher enter a contest to open for Nas at his Mumbai concert, and Murad advances to the finals after a successful rap battle. His confidence having improved from the appreciation he receives from fans, Murad finally stands up to Aftab and Ateeq when they belittle his passion. He later gets back together with Safeena. He goes on to win the contest and becomes one of India's top rappers. The film ends with his friends, family and Safeena watching him happily as he begins his triumphant opening performance.

Cast 

Ranveer Singh as Murad Ahmed a.k.a. Gully Boy
Alia Bhatt as Safeena Firdausi, Murad's possessive girlfriend
Siddhant Chaturvedi as Shrikant Bhosle a.k.a. MC Sher
Vijay Raaz as Aftab Shakir Ahmed
Vijay Varma as Moeen Arif
Amruta Subhash as Razia Ahmed
Ikhlaque Khan as Nasir Firdausi, Safeena's father
Sheeba Chaddha as Hamida Firdausi, Safeena's mother
Kalki Koechlin as Shweta Mehta a.k.a. Sky
Ayaan Zubair Rahmani as Safeena's brother
Rahul Piske as Chintoo
Jyoti Subhash as Dadi
Nakul Roshan Sahdev as Salman
Shruti Chauhan as Maya
Vijay Maurya as Ateeq Khan, Murad's uncle
Srishti Shrivastava as Albina Dadarkar
Mallika Singh as Suhani, Safeena's best friend
Tina Bhatia as Parveen
Rahil Gilani as Rishi
Svar Kamble as Suhail
Chaitnya Sharma as MC Checkmate
Jasleen Royal as Juhi
Michaela Tanwar as Gemma
Kubra Sait as Scarlett
Shah Rule as himself
Sambhav Jain as Bandra Boy
Manj Musik as rap battle judge
Omi Kashyap as Driver
Raja Kumari as rap battle judge
Bobby Friction as rap battle judge
DIVINE as himself
Emiway Bantai as himself
KR$NA as himself
Brodha V as himself
Rohit Sangwan as Editor

Production
Akhtar co-opted the story of two Mumbai based MCs, Naezy and DIVINE, into a musical story portraying a struggle of an aspiring rapper and his surroundings that influence his journey. Principal photography of the film began on 10 February 2018 and it was wrapped up by April 2018. American rapper Nas was an executive producer for the film.

Soundtrack
The 18-song soundtrack, which was released on all streaming platforms on 12 January 2019, involves an estimated 54 contributors, including rappers from across the country, deejays, music producers and beatboxers, such as DIVINE, Naezy, Sez on the Beat, Rishi Rich, Dub Sharma, Jasleen Royal, Ace, Ishq Bector, MC Altaf, MC TodFod, 100RBH, Maharya, Noxious D, Viveick Rajagopalan, and others. As music supervisor, Ankur Tewari worked with the diverse group of artists in the studio, aiming to "bring the two worlds of hip hop and Bollywood together".

A promotional single for the film, "NY Se Mumbai", was released on 9 February 2019 and performed by DIVINE, Naezy and Ranveer Singh, along with American rapper Nas. The track was produced by XD Pro Music, a Toronto based producer duo, and Ill Wayno.

Marketing and release 

Gully Boy was confirmed to be releasing on 14 February 2019 by Alia Bhatt. The first look official poster of the film was released on 1 January 2019 and reconfirmed the release date to be 14 February 2019. Two new theatrical posters revealing looks of the lead actors of the film unveiled for the public on 2 January 2019. The film was selected in Berlinale Special section of 69th Berlin International Film Festival. The film was screened on 9 February 2019 for its world premiere at the festival. It was released in India on 14 February 2019 on 3,350 screens and in overseas markets on 751 screens, with a worldwide count of 4,101 screens.

Some writers speculated about similarities between Gully Boy and the Eminem-starring 8 Mile (2002). Writer Aditya Magal in The Quint called it, though appreciating the movie as entertaining, after outlining what he considers the many similarities, "an engineered, Indianized version of 8 Mile". Journalist Rachna Tyagi of The Week was more harsh in her review, rating it 2.5/5 and calling it "a copycat Indian version of the film." Denying the claims, director Zoya Akhtar responded "I get it (the comparison). I totally understand it, because that's the reference point and that's what they've seen so, that's the immediate reference point and people here just love to do that."

Home video
The film was made available as VOD on Amazon Prime Video on 16 April 2019.

Distribution
AA Films acquired the All India distribution rights while Cinestaan AA Distributors and Zee Studios International acquired the overseas distribution rights

Reception

Critical response
Gully Boy received critical acclaim, with praise for the storyline, direction, music, screenplay, and performances (particularly Singh, Chaturvedi, Varma and Bhatt). 

Anna M. M. Vetticad of Firstpost gave Gully Boy four stars out of five, writing, "Ranveer Singh and Alia Bhatt are devastatingly good in Zoya Akhtar's ultimate anthem for the rebel". Raja Sen of Hindustan Times called it "the first great Hindi film of 2019", while Taran Adarsh of Bollywood Hungama called it "Akhtar’s best film to date". Rachit Gupta of The Times of India also gave four stars. Sukanya Verma of Rediff.com also gave four stars. Livemint wrote, "It’s a hard-won transformation – bohot hard – and it rings true". Anupama Chopra commented, "By the end, I was wiping tears and cheering furiously not just for Murad, but for each one of these characters to find happiness".

Saibal Chatterjee of NDTV opined, "Gully Boy can be whole-heartedly commended for its craft, fascinating characters and Ranveer Singh. He absolutely kills the slow-burning rapper act. What's more, he does with a lot of energy to spare." Writing for Film Companion, Baradwaj Rangan gave Gully Boy three stars out of five and found it to be "softer than expected, but hugely entertaining and beautifully made". Ananya Bhattacharya of India Today rated it three stars out of five. Mayur Sanap of Deccan Chronicle also gave it three stars. The Wire felt the film dealt with Bollywood tropes.

Manjusha Radhakrishnan of Gulf News rated the film 4/5 and wrote, "When he breaks down, you break down with him and that’s one of the biggest victories of Gully Boy". Among international reviewers, Lee Marshall of Screen International wrote, "Singh busts rhymes with the best of them in this energetic, entertaining film". Peter Bradshaw of The Guardian gave the film three stars of five. Deborah Young of The Hollywood Reporter commended Akhtar for her direction. Anita Iyer of Khaleej Times rated the film four stars out of five. Jay Weissberg of Variety wrote, "Zoya Akhtar's most accomplished film to date is a mainstream rap musical about a Muslim guy from working-class Mumbai determined to break free from the strictures of expectation and class, all served up with generous helpings of deftly written hip-hop lyrics and a largely well-woven narrative" starring "Ranveer Singh in all his charms." Raja Sen of NDTV gave the film 4 out of 5 stars and said, "Zoya Akhtar’s Gully Boy, an underdog story shining a light on India’s incipient hip-hop subculture, is the first great Hindi film of 2019 and a rousing celebration of spunk. The writing is enthralling, the texture fantastic, and this world is a revelation. Here are characters without room to breathe who express themselves breathlessly, through a style of music that has always belonged to the marginalised. Dissent finds a way — and a beat."

Box office
In two weeks of release, the film grossed .

Awards and nominations 

The film won 13 awards at the 65th Filmfare Awards, the most awards for a single film in a year, has broken the record of Black, which won 11 awards in 2006. It also became the sixth film to win all four acting awards. The film also won 12 awards at 26th Screen Awards and 9 awards in Zee Cine Awards.

Internationally, it won the NETPAC Award for Best Asian Film at the 2019 Bucheon International Fantastic Film Festival in South Korea. The film was also India's official entry to the 92nd Academy Awards for the Best International feature film category, though it was not nominated.

Controversies 
Gully Boy attracted controversy over its 13 wins at the 65th Filmfare Awards. Several Twitter users and fans were extremely disappointed and made calls to boycott the awards, with #BoycottFilmfare trending on the micro-blogging site. While many thought that the film was a deserving winner, others were unhappy and even termed the awards as "snub fare", calling it a move to "justify sending it as a nomination for the Oscars". Subsequently, when the Filmfare Award for Best Lyricist went to the rap song "Apna Time Aayega" instead of the patriotic song "Teri Mitti" from the 2019 period war film Kesari, lyricist Manoj Muntashir tweeted his disappointment at the decision, pledging not to attend future award ceremonies, and gained support from fans and other musicians alike.

See also
 List of submissions to the 92nd Academy Awards for Best International Feature Film
 List of Indian submissions for the Academy Award for Best International Feature Film

References

External links 
 
 Gully Boy on Bollywood Hungama
 

2019 films
2010s Hindi-language films
Films scored by Ishq Bector
Films scored by Karsh Kale
Films directed by Zoya Akhtar
Films shot in Mumbai
Films about violence against women
Indian interfaith romance films
Films set in Mumbai
2010s musical films
2010s hip hop films
Indian musical films
Hood films
Hip hop soundtracks
2010s American films